Blue Eye Run is a  long 1st order tributary to Brokenstraw Creek.  It is classed as an Exceptional Value stream by the Pennsylvania Fish and Boat Commission.

Course
Blue Eye Run rises in Warren County, Pennsylvania about 4 miles west of Wrightsville, Pennsylvania and flows southeast to meet Brokenstraw Creek just east of Garland.

Watershed
Blue Eye Run drains  of the Pennsylvania High Plateau province and is underlaid by the Venango Formation. The watershed receives an average of 43.7 in/year of precipitation and has a wetness index of 378.49.  The watershed is about 82% forested.

See also 
 List of rivers of Pennsylvania

References

Rivers of Pennsylvania
Tributaries of the Allegheny River
Rivers of Warren County, Pennsylvania